The Richmond–San Rafael Bridge (also officially named the John F. McCarthy Memorial Bridge) is the northernmost of the east–west crossings of the San Francisco Bay in California, USA. Officially named after California State Senator John F. McCarthy, it bridges Interstate 580 from Richmond on the east to San Rafael on the west. It opened in 1956, replacing ferry service by the Richmond–San Rafael Ferry Company.

History

Early proposals
Proposals for a bridge were advanced in the 1920s, preceding the completion of the Golden Gate Bridge. In 1927, Roy O. Long of The Richmond–San Rafael Bridge, Incorporated, applied for a franchise to construct and operate a private toll bridge. Charles Derleth, Jr. was selected as the consulting engineer, after having served in that role for the recently completed Carquinez Bridge. The Long bridge would have spanned San Pablo Bay between Point Orient (in Contra Costa County) to just below McNear's Point (in Marin County), and Long was granted the franchise in February 1928 by the Contra Costa County Board of Supervisors.

A competing proposed bridge also came out in 1927, from Charles Van Damme of the Richmond-San Rafael Ferry Company. It would have spanned San Pablo Bay from Castro Point (Contra Costa County) to Point San Quentin (Marin County), approximately the same routing as the eventually completed 1956 bridge. Although the 1927 Long bridge had been granted a franchise in February 1928, Van Damme subsequently petitioned to reopen the case, since the ferry company owned the land at the proposed eastern terminus and therefore should have been favored in the franchise selection process. Also, since the ferry company's franchise rights were not set to expire until the 1950s, Long's 1927 bridge cost would have increased to reimburse losses to ferry revenues.

Van Damme and Long later agreed in September 1928 to merge their interests for a combined bridge proposal between Point San Pablo (Contra Costa County) and McNear's Point (Marin County). The combined project, now headed by Oscar Klatt for the American Toll Bridge Company, received approval for the routing from then-Secretary of War Good in May 1929, although vertical and horizontal clearances for the proposed bridge were not fully established at the time. The construction permit was issued in February 1930.

Klatt's 1929 bridge was dormant for nearly a decade following the issuance of a construction permit in 1930. An extension was filed in 1938 to allow construction to start as late as February 1942, and fresh plans for a bridge district to facilitate financing were announced in 1939. In 1947, interest was revived in bridging Marin and Contra Costa Counties.

Tomasini's San Francisco–Alameda–Marin crossings
A third bridge was proposed in late 1927 by the enigmatic T.A. Tomasini. In 1928, Tomasini presented a revised proposal for a bridge farther south than the other two bridges—spanning the water from Albany (in Alameda County) to Tiburon. The 1928 Tomasini Albany–Tiburon bridge was the longest of the three proposed bridges by a significant margin. The cost of the longer spans required would have made the proposed Albany–Tiburon bridge impractical, and Tomasini argued that "any mariner who could not negotiate a bridge such as proposed should lose his license."

Tomasini would later add a bridge spanning Richardson Bay in March 1928 from Sausalito to Belvedere to his proposal. Meanwhile, in April 1928 Tomasini recruited the prominent Ralph Modjeski to serve as the consulting head engineer for the proposed Albany–Tiburon span, and Modjeski promptly complimented the plans that had been drawn up by Tomasini's chief engineer, Erle L. Cope. The design for a lift span in the proposed Sausalito–Belvedere bridge was changed to a bascule after public comments were received from a local shipbuilder. Tomasini received a permit for the Sausalito–Belvedere bridge from the War Department in December 1928. Tomasini had planned to commence construction of the Sausalito–Belvedere bridge in July 1930, but he was met with opposition from the Tiburon-Belvedere Chamber of Commerce, who felt the creation of a bridge would eliminate the promised San Francisco-Tiburon ferry service. In 1931, the Richardson Bay Redwood Bridge was opened, which was the largest structure in the world constructed of redwood. The Redwood Bridge carried the Redwood Highway (present-day US 101) and spanned the upper reach of Richardson Bay, eliminating some of the need for the proposed Sausalito–Belvedere bridge. The Redwood Bridge would be replaced by a concrete structure in the 1950s.

Tomasini continued to add to the project scope in July 1928 by proposing a bridge and tunnel to join San Francisco to the proposed Albany–Tiburon bridge. Tomasini organized each of the three proposed structures as independent projects, preferably to be built simultaneously, but in the event that one was not approved, it would not delay the construction of the other two. San Francisco's board of supervisors rejected Tomasini's San Francisco–Marin–Alameda tunnel and bridge in September 1928, although the board's action was non-binding.

By February 1932, Tomasini's proposed Albany–Tiburon bridge had changed to a combination bridge—tunnel. Total estimated cost for the two structures was now  and despite opposition from the US Navy, who cited potential navigation hazards, the bridge—tunnel was approved by the War Department in July 1932. Although he had the permit to begin work, Tomasini filed numerous annual extensions to retain the rights through 1941, apparently due to a lack of funding to start work. Tomasini was still scrambling for funding in August 1941, seeking the issue of bonds worth . Tomasini lost the rights to the crossing in October 1941, which was not the first time he was opposed by Earl Warren, who had questioned the validity of Tomasini's franchise as early as 1933. Still, Tomasini was doggedly trying to advance his plans as late as 1948.

Construction: 1953–1956

In 1949, the County of Marin and the City of Richmond commissioned a preliminary engineering report from Earl and Wright of San Francisco, which concluded that a bridge would be feasible. A follow-up 1950 study, conducted by the Division of San Francisco Bay Toll Crossings, was commissioned by Marin County and the City of Richmond using  in state funding. The 1950 report concluded the bridge could be built in accordance with the California Toll Bridge Authority Act. The preliminary design was approved on 1951-08-08 and California approved the preliminary report on 1951-11-27. The remaining  was reserved for construction contingencies and to complete the lower deck of the bridge. The bridge was finished $4 million under budget.

During the study period, an earth and rock-fill bridge with lift structures was considered, but the high-level bridge was chosen as the cost of a low bridge with navigation locks and lifting structures was prohibitive.

The majority of construction costs were tied up in two contracts that opened for bidding on 1952-12-19. The substructure construction moved rapidly, with an estimated 45% of piers completed approximately a year after the contract was awarded.

The bridge was completed in 1956. It was dedicated on August 31, and opened for traffic on September 1. At the time, it was the world's second-longest bridge, behind the San Francisco–Oakland Bay Bridge, as well as the longest continuous steel bridge.

Historical notes
Originally a part of State Route 17, the bridge is now part of Interstate 580.

Upon its opening, the Richmond–San Rafael bridge was the last bridge across San Francisco Bay to replace a previous ferry service, leaving the Benicia–Martinez Ferry across Carquinez Strait as the only remaining auto ferry in the Bay Area (it would be replaced by a bridge in 1962).

Description

The bridge—including approaches—measures 5.5 miles (29,040 feet / 8,851.39 m / 8.9 km) long. At the time it was built, it was one of the world's longest bridges. The bridge spans two ship channels and has two separate main cantilever spans. Both main cantilever spans are raised to allow ship traffic to pass, and in between, there is a "dip" in the elevation of the center section, giving the bridge a vertical undulation or "roller coaster" appearance and also the nickname "roller coaster span". To save money, the cantilever main spans share identical symmetric designs, so the "uphill" grade on the approach required for the elevated span is duplicated on the other "downhill" side, resulting in a depressed center truss section. In addition, because the navigation channels are not parallel to each other, the bridge also does not follow a straight line. This appearance has also been referred to as a "bent coat hanger".

After it was completed, many were disappointed by the appearance of the bridge; Frank Lloyd Wright, a famous designer who was not an engineer, reportedly called for it to be destroyed due to its ugliness, and complained that it was "the most awful thing I've ever seen" during its construction in 1953. Contrariwise, the neighboring Golden Gate Bridge, and the western span of the Bay Bridge, had been considered engineering and historical marvels. However, the project's senior engineers were the same ones who had worked on the Bay Bridge, with their design reflecting lessons they had learned from doing so.

From west (Point San Quentin) to east (Castro Point), the bridge consists of:
 A  trestle structure supported by fifty-seven bents.
  of girder spans, consisting of nineteen  girder spans
  of  girder spans
Despite the varying height of the bridge, roadway grades are limited to 3% or less. As completed, the bridge has two decks each capable of carrying three lanes of traffic. As of 2020, westbound traffic rides on the upper deck and is marked with two lanes of vehicle traffic, as well as a pedestrian/bicycle path separated from vehicles by a movable barrier. Eastbound traffic rides on the lower deck and features two lanes of vehicle traffic as well as a third lane that is activated during evening commute hours and serves as a shoulder when not in use. The extra lane features lights indicating that the lane is open or closed. The third lane has been used for various purposes other than traffic, such as carrying a water pipeline during a drought.

The bridge stands on 79 reinforced concrete piers supported on steel H-piles. Nine piers stand on land, eight are in cofferdams near the Contra Costa terminus, and the remaining 62 are bell-type piers with a flared base. To facilitate maintenance, the bridge was designed with two  lines (carrying compressed air and potable water) extending from end to end. Each deck was also equipped with three overhead maintenance tracks.

Public transit service
Golden Gate Transit bus route 580 provides public transportation across the bridge. Formerly route 40, it runs between the San Rafael Transit Center and the El Cerrito del Norte BART station. Golden Gate Transit Route 42, which provided service to Richmond BART/Amtrak station, was folded into route 40 in December 2015 that was later redesignated line 580, after the freeway on which it crosses the bay.

Tolls

Tolls are only collected from westbound traffic headed to San Rafael at the toll plaza on the east side of the bridge. All-electronic tolling has been in effect since 2020, and drivers may either pay using the FasTrak electronic toll collection device, using the license plate tolling program, or via a one time payment online. Effective , the toll rate for passenger cars is $7. During peak traffic hours, carpool vehicles carrying three or more people, clean air vehicles, or motorcycles may pay a discounted toll of $3.50 if they have FasTrak and use the designated carpool lane. Drivers must pay within 48 hours after crossing the bridge or they will be sent a toll violation invoice. No additional fees will be added to the toll violation if it is paid within 21 days.

Historical toll rates 
The following initial toll rates were adopted on July 10, 1956 prior to the opening of the bridge:

The basic toll (for automobiles) on the seven state bridges, including the Richmond–San Rafael Bridge, was raised to $1 by Regional Measure 1, approved by Bay Area voters in 1988. A $1 seismic retrofit surcharge was added in 1998 by the state legislature, originally for eight years, but since then extended to December 2037 (AB1171, October 2001). On March 2, 2004, voters approved Regional Measure 2, raising the toll by another dollar to a total of $3. An additional dollar was added to the toll starting January 1, 2007, to cover cost overruns concerning the replacement of the eastern span.

The Metropolitan Transportation Commission, a regional transportation agency, in its capacity as the Bay Area Toll Authority, administers RM1 and RM2 funds, allocating a significant portion to public transit capital improvements and operating subsidies in the transportation corridors the bridges serve. Caltrans administers the "second dollar" seismic surcharge, and receives some of the MTC-administered funds to perform other maintenance work on the bridges. The Bay Area Toll Authority is made up of appointed officials put in place by various city and county governments, and is not subject to direct voter oversight.

Due to further funding shortages for seismic retrofit projects, the Bay Area Toll Authority again raised tolls on all seven of the state-owned bridges in July 2010. The toll rate for autos on the Richmond–San Rafael Bridge was thus increased to $5.

In June 2018, Bay Area voters approved Regional Measure 3 to further raise the tolls on all seven of the state-owned bridges to fund $4.5 billion worth of transportation improvements in the area. Under the passed measure, the toll rate for autos on the Richmond–San Rafael Bridge will be increased to $6 on January 1, 2019; to $7 on January 1, 2022; and then to $8 on January 1, 2025.

In September 2019, the MTC approved a $4 million plan to eliminate toll takers and convert all seven of the state-owned bridges to all-electronic tolling, citing that 80 percent of drivers are now using Fastrak and the change would improve traffic flow. On March 20, 2020, accelerated by the COVID-19 pandemic, all-electronic tolling was placed in effect for all seven state-owned toll bridges. The MTC then installed new systems at all seven bridges to make them permanently cashless by the start of 2021. In April 2022, the Bay Area Toll Authority announced plans to remove all remaining unused toll booths and create an open-road tolling system which functions at highway speeds.

Improvements

Seismic retrofit

In the fall of 2001, the bridge commenced an extensive seismic retrofit program, similar to other bridges in the area. The retrofit was designed by a three-way joint venture between Gerwick/Sverdrup/DMJM under a  design contract awarded in 1995. The retrofit is intended to allow the two-tier bridge to withstand a 7.4 magnitude earthquake on the Hayward Fault and an 8.3 magnitude quake on the San Andreas Fault. The foundation piers were strengthened by wrapping the lower section of structural steel in a concrete casing, installing new shear piles, and adding bracing to the structural steel towers. Isolation joints and bearings were also added to the main bridge structures (cantilever spans over the navigation channels) to strengthen the structure.

The fifty-year-old bridge was showing its age and also needed age-related maintenance, which was performed in conjunction with the seismic upgrade work. There were reports of cars being damaged while traveling on the lower deck by fist-sized concrete chunks falling from the joints of upper deck slabs.

A major part of the retrofit involved the long concrete causeway on the Marin side, which as part of the retrofit program, was nearly completely replaced. Because of the active use of the bridge, Caltrans designed the project to allow the bridge to remain open to traffic. For economy, schedule efficiency and traffic impact mitigation, much of the repair work was fabricated off site and shipped to the bridge by barge.

To reduce impacts to traffic the major work was performed at night.  Caltrans kept two lanes of traffic moving in each direction during daylight hours, then reduced that flow to a single lane in each direction at night. Thus, one trestle was completely closed, and the other trestle had two-way traffic.

The concrete segments of the trestle were precast in Petaluma and barged to the site. At monthly intervals, tugs positioned barges with one or two , 500-ton pre-cast concrete roadway segments, which a 900-ton barge-mounted crane lifted into place. Earlier, either two or four of the corroded,  concrete segments of the old roadway were removed by crane. Then, a pile driver moved into position and drove new piles. After the new concrete road segment was in place, steel plates were used to temporarily fill the gaps, and the roadway was ready for morning traffic. At times, construction backed up traffic to Highway 101 into central San Rafael.

The completion of this retrofit, on September 22, 2005 was celebrated as a success despite the many challenges, including the deaths of two workers.

The final cost of the retrofit, however, was $778 million, or $136 million below this August 2004 estimate.

Third lanes

In both directions, the bridge is wide enough to accommodate three lanes of traffic. Currently the third lane on the lower deck is used as a right-hand shoulder or a "breakdown lane" and is marked along the bridge with the signs "Emergency Parking Only". The third lane on the upper deck is a separated bicycle and pedestrian path.

In 1977, Marin County was suffering one of its worst droughts in history. A temporary on-surface pipeline, six miles (10 km) long, was placed in the third lane. The pipe transferred 8,000,000 gallons of water a day from the East Bay Municipal Utility District's mains in Richmond to Marin's 170,000 residents.  By 1978, the drought subsided and the pipeline was removed.  The disused third lane was then restriped as a shoulder.

In 1989, after the Loma Prieta earthquake, the third lane was opened up as a normal lane to accommodate increased traffic after the Bay Bridge was shut down because of a failure of that span. Many commuters from San Francisco drove across the Golden Gate Bridge into Marin and then across the Richmond–San Rafael Bridge to go to Oakland (and vice versa). After the Bay Bridge was reopened, the third lane was again closed.

On February 11, 2015, the Bay Area Toll Authority approved a plan to install a protected bike and pedestrian path on the wide shoulder of the upper deck of the bridge. The path was expected to be complete in 2017, however it opened on November 16, 2019. As part of the same project, a third eastbound lane was added the previous year on the lower deck to be available for evening commutes.

Closures
Like most San Francisco Bay bridges, this bridge is occasionally closed due to strong crosswinds. The bridge was closed on the morning of Friday, January 4, 2008 as a southerly wind gusting to nearly  buffeted the span, knocking over four trucks on the lower deck and one truck on the upper deck. The bridge was closed for six hours. It was re-opened by late afternoon as the strong winds subsided.

This was not the first closure due to high winds. A tractor-trailer overturned in high winds in 1963, forcing the closure of two lanes. At least one previous event occurred in the late 1970s when high northerly winds forced the CHP to close the bridge. Wind gusts (reported in the Marin Independent Journal) reached 80 mph.

On October 27, 2000 the toll plaza allowed people to cross free of charge due to a "shelter in place" order affecting toll booth operators.  The order was given by the Richmond Fire Department in response to a release of toxic gas from a recycling plant.

On February 7, 2019 the bridge was closed for several hours due to concrete falling from the upper deck to the lower.

In popular culture & film
The novel Abuse of Power by Michael Savage has several important scenes set on the bridge. In one, the hero Jack Hatfield escapes his enemies by climbing the work ladders built into the piers. In the film Magnum Force, the bridge is in the background when Dirty Harry and the rookie cop are on motorcycles on the ship's decks where they attempt to subdue each other. The bridge is also visible in the 1982 film 48 Hours.

References

External links

 Bay Area FasTrak – includes toll information on this and the other Bay Area toll facilities
 With Little Fanfare... Marin IJ article on the 50th anniversary of the bridge
 Richmond–San Rafael Bridge Retrofit Completed
Caltrans Seismic Retrofit overview
 California Dept. of Transportation: Richmond–San Rafael Bridge History & Information
 
 Univ. of California, Berkeley: Bridging the Bay: Richmond–San Rafael Bridge
 Decades of Struggle for Bicycle Access
 Bay Area Toll Authority—Bridge Facts—Richmond–San Rafael Bridge 
 Footage of the official bridge opening ceremony from September 1956
 Eastern cantilever span from Point Richmond looking West
 
 
 
 
 
 
 

Bridges completed in 1956
Bridges in the San Francisco Bay Area
Buildings and structures in Richmond, California
San Francisco Bay
Toll bridges in California
Tolled sections of Interstate Highways
Bridges in Contra Costa County, California
Bridges in Marin County, California
Double-decker bridges
Road bridges in California
Buildings and structures in San Rafael, California
Landmarks in the San Francisco Bay Area
Bridges on the Interstate Highway System
San Francisco Bay Trail
Steel bridges in the United States
Cantilever bridges in the United States
Pratt truss bridges in the United States
Trestle bridges in the United States
1956 establishments in California
Pedestrian bridges in California